Funbox are a Scottish musical theatre group and children entertainers. The group tour, performing music and comedy for children, with a focus on traditional Scottish playground songs.

Origins 
Members Anya Scott-Rodgers, Kevin MacLeod and Gary Coupland were all previously members of The Singing Kettle, when it disbanded in 2015 after 30 years.  The three were informed that the touring "Singing Kettle" company was not available for purchase, after the retirement of two of the group's founding members in 2012.  They therefore formed Funbox. One of the founder members of The Singing Kettle returned to touring in 2019 with solo performances.

Members

Gary Coupland
Gary Coupland MBE (born 26 March 1964) is the group's musician and composer.  He was one of the original members of The Singing Kettle. He studied at Napier University (where he was named Alumni of the Year in 2014)and at The London College of Music.  He received an MBE in 1999 for services to Children’s theatre and is a patron of Down's Syndrome Scotland.

Kevin Macleod
Kevin Macleod (born 9 March 1969) was originally The Singing Kettle's stage manager, before joining the group and later forming Funbox.  He also plays 'Bonzo', a canine character he brought with him from The Singing Kettle.

He studied stage management at Queen Margaret College and compères at Celtic Connections and the Orkney Folk Festival.

Anya Scott-Rodgers
Anya Scott-Rodgers (born 7 October 1987) fronted The Singing Kettle in 2013 after auditioning among hundreds of applicants.  She is a graduate of Glasgow University, Reid Kerr College and Glasgow College of Nautical Studies. She plays guitar.

Tours
The group's first appearance was at the 2015 Celtic Connections, followed by their debut tour, Pirates and Princesses, in 2015.

Large Scale Tours

Small Community Tours

 Pirates 
 Highland Fling 
 Rocking All Over The World 
 Funbox at the Fringe
 Fancy Dress Fun
 Animal Magic
 Space Race

References

External links
 Funbox's web site

British children's musical groups
Scottish musical groups
Musical groups established in 2015
2015 establishments in Scotland